= Arno Nordlund =

Finnish footballer (born 1935)

Personal information
- Date of birth: 2 September 1935 (age 91)

International career
Years	Team	Apps	(Gls)
1961	Finland	2	(0)

Arno Nordlund (born 2 September 1935) is a Finnish footballer. He played in two matches for the Finland national football team in 1961.
